John Griffiths may refer to:
Jonathan Griffiths, Welsh rugby footballer
Jonathan Griffiths (shipowner) (1773-1839),English-born Australian convict, shipowner and builder